The Golden Globe Award for Best Animated Feature Film is a Golden Globe Award that was awarded for the first time at the 64th Golden Globe Awards in 2007. It was the first time that the Golden Globe Awards had created a separate category for animated films since its establishment. The nominations are announced in January and an awards ceremony is held later in the month. Initially, only three films were nominated for best animated film, in contrast to five nominations for the majority of other awards. The Pixar film Cars was the first recipient of the award.

Eligibility
English-language films may be nominated in only one feature category. Therefore, films nominated in this category are ineligible to be nominated for Best Motion Picture – Musical or Comedy, Best Motion Picture – Drama if their principal dialogue is in English. However, films nominated for Best Foreign Language Film are eligible for Best Animated Feature; the only Golden Globe film awards for which they are ineligible are the aforementioned two Best Motion Picture awards. This has led to much confusion leading many to believe animated films are snubbed in the Best Motion Picture categories, specifically Best Motion Picture – Musical or Comedy where animated films have won and/or were nominated before, but in reality (since 2006) they simply are not eligible to be nominated. On November 17, 2009, the Hollywood Foreign Press Association announced that at the 67th Annual Golden Globe Awards, there will be five nominees for Best Animated Feature Film, as its members voted to amend its rules: eligible films must be feature-length (70 minutes or longer) with no more than 25% live action. If fewer than eight animated films qualify, the award will not be given, in which case the films would be eligible for Best Picture. If fewer than twelve animated films qualify, the category will be limited to three nominations per year.

Winners and nominees

2000s

2010s

2020s

Breakdown
Pixar Animation Studios - 9 wins, 16 nominations
Walt Disney Animation Studios - 3 wins, 12 nominations
DreamWorks Animation - 1 win, 11 nominations
Sony Pictures Animation - 1 win, 4 nominations
Laika - 1 win, 4 nominations
Nickelodeon Movies - 1 win, 2 nominations
Netflix - 1 win, 2 nominations
Aardman Animations - no wins, 2 nominations
Blue Sky Studios - no wins, 2 nominations
Warner Bros. Pictures - no wins, 2 nominations
Cartoon Saloon - no wins, 2 nominations
Indian Paintbrush/American Empirical Pictures - no wins, 2 nominations
Illumination Entertainment - no wins, 3 nominations

See also 
 BAFTA Award for Best Animated Film
 Annie Award for Best Animated Feature
 Annie Award for Best Animated Feature — Independent
 Academy Award for Best Animated Feature
 Japan Media Arts Festival
 Animation Kobe
 Tokyo Anime Award
 Saturn Award for Best Animated Film
 List of animated feature films awards

References 

Animated Feature Film
Awards for best animated feature film
Awards established in 2007
2007 establishments in the United States